Kamarlin bin Ombi is a Malaysian politician who was serving as the Assistant Minister and Member of Sabah State Legislative Assembly (MLA) for Lumadan from March 2008 until May 2018. He is a member of the United Malays National Organisation (UMNO) which is aligned with the ruling Perikatan Nasional (PN) coalition both in federal and state levels.

Election results

References

Members of the Sabah State Legislative Assembly
United Malays National Organisation politicians
Living people
Year of birth missing (living people)